The Catholic University of Pusan  is situated in the southeastern South Korean port city of Busan.  The current president is Son Sam-seok.  The university is traditionally focused on nursing and health sciences, but in addition to these fields it includes schools of environmental science, business administration, computer information engineering, and social welfare.  It enrolls about 1,200 students.

History
In 1964, the Maryknoll School of Nursing opened under the directorship of Rita Catherine Bonin,  attached to Maryknoll Sisters Hospital.  It was reorganized as Maryknoll Nursing Junior College in 1971.  It was renamed Pusan Catholic College in 1990.  In 1999, it united with Jisan College (est. 1979), another Catholic nursing school in Busan, to form the present-day entity of the Catholic University of Pusan.

An Organization of Education Topics

An ideology 
Humanitarianism - Spirit of Catholicism/trust, love, service

Topic 
An Honest volunteer (worker) for one person

Introduce of Department in Cup 

We have 6 main departments and 17 majors in our school

 College of Theology (신학대학)
 College of Nursing (간호대학)
 College of Health Sciences (보건과학대학)
 College of Applied Sciences (응용과학대학)
 College of Social Sciences (사회과학대학)
 The Faculty of Management
 The Faculty of Circulation Management Information
 The Faculty of Social Welfare
 College of Humanity Culture (인성교양부)

See also
List of colleges and universities in South Korea
Education in South Korea

External links
Official School Website, in English
Official School Library Website
Official CUP Total Information System. #Can Access only student#

Universities and colleges in Busan
Nursing schools in South Korea
Catholic universities and colleges in South Korea
Educational institutions established in 1964
1964 establishments in South Korea